Ogonnelloe GAA  is a Gaelic Athletic Association club located in the parish of Ogonnelloe, County Clare in Ireland. The club field teams in hurling competitions.

Ogonnelloe enjoyed their most successful times over a 20 year duration when they climbed from Junior in 1988 through Intermediate which they won in 1995, into senior where they remained until 2009.
During this time they collected a Junior 'A' and Intermediate championship, as well as a Clare Cup and two Senior 'B' championships.
Ogonnelloe currently compete at Intermediate level.

Since 2005, Ogonnelloe have been amalgamated with Scariff GAA at underage level up to U-21. In the second year of the amalgamation they enjoyed a great run in the U-21 'A' Championship, concluding in a narrow loss to Newmarket-on-Fergus in the final replay. In the years since then, they have tasted success at U-14, U-15, U-16 and Minor 'B' and 'C' level. 
Scariff/Ogonnelloe won the U-21 'A' Championship in 2022, the first championship win at 'A' grade for the amalgamation.

In January 2020, Ogonnelloe announced the development of an indoor astro pitch in Dr. Stuart Park.

Major honours
 Clare Senior Hurling Championship (1): 1888 
 Clare Senior B Hurling Championship (2): 1999, 2005 
 Clare Intermediate Hurling Championship (1): 1995 
 Clare Junior A Hurling Championship (3): 1937, 1988, 2021 
 Clare Club Hurling League - Division 1 Div.1 (Clare Cup) (1): 1999
 Clare Hurling League Div.3 (2): 2016, 2021
 Clare Under-21 A Hurling Championship (1): 2022 (with Scariff)

Notable players and club members
Joseph Stuart: 19th President of the GAA
David Forde (Clare hurler): All-Ireland Winner 1997
Patrick McMillan 2018 Winter Olympics' Skier
Damien Varley Former Munster and Ireland rugby player

References

External links
Official Site

Gaelic games clubs in County Clare
Hurling clubs in County Clare